John R. Brazil (1946-2022) was an American professor of English and American Studies. He was the president of Trinity University in San Antonio, Texas from 1999 until his retirement in January 2010.

Career
He was a native of California. He received an A.B. in History in 1968 from Stanford University. He held the Master of Philosophy and Ph.D. degrees in American Studies from Yale University.

He taught at Yale, then at San Jose State University where he became acting academic vice president.  He became president of Southeastern Massachusetts University in 1984, that title changing to chancellor when the university became part of the University of Massachusetts system as the University of Massachusetts Dartmouth. He became president of Bradley in 1992. In 1999 he became the 17th president of Trinity University, leaving that position in 2010.

He served as a member of the U.S. Department of Education and American Association of State Colleges and Universities’ mission of American university presidents to the Soviet Union in 1989. In 1997 he was awarded an Honorary Doctor degree from the Samara State University in Russia.

He published extensively in such scholarly journals as the American Quarterly, Twentieth-Century Literary Criticism, American Literary Realism, and the Mississippi Quarterly, and has made numerous presentations.

He was a Director of Caterpillar Inc. from 1998 until 2010.

Brazil and his wife, Janice Hosking Brazil, had two children, a son, Adrian, and a daughter, Morgan.

Recognition
He was a Fulbright Senior Scholar at the University of Sydney in 1980. He is a member of Phi Beta Kappa and Phi Kappa Phi honor societies, Beta Gamma Sigma international honor society in business administration, and an honorary member of Gold Key and Delta Mu Delta national honor society in business administration.

References

Bradley University people
Caterpillar Inc. people
Living people
Trinity University (Texas) faculty
Stanford University alumni
Yale Graduate School of Arts and Sciences alumni
Heads of universities and colleges in the United States
1946 births